Capperia polonica is a moth of the family Pterophoridae. It is found in Spain, France, Sardinia, Corsica, Croatia and Greece. It has also been recorded from Asia Minor.

The wingspan is 14–18 mm.

The larvae feed on Teucrium flavum.

References

Oxyptilini
Moths described in 1951
Moths of Asia
Plume moths of Europe
Taxa named by Stanislaw Adamczewski